The large chequered skipper (Heteropterus morpheus) is a species of butterfly in the family Hesperiidae. It is the single member of the monotypic genus Heteropterus. The species can be found in isolated populations in Europe and east across the Palearctic to Central Asia and Korea. It is endangered in the Netherlands.

Taxonomy
Formerly, the genus Heteropterus also included the following species:
 Heteropterus formosus Butler, 1894 - transferred to Willema formosus (Butler, 1894)
 Heteropterus willemi Wallengren, 1857 - transferred to Willema willemi (Wallengren, 1857)

Description
The length of the forewings is 15–18 mm. The butterfly is on the wing from June to August, depending on the location.

The butterfly has a very distinctive and attractive underside but a drab upperside (which is rarely seen, as it usually settles with wings closed).  This butterfly is very similar to the Chequered skipper, but they have their own attributes that allow them to be distinguished.

Distribution and habitat
In France, it has been seen in the south west including, in 2011, the Hautes-Pyrénées department.

Behaviour and ecology
The flight is just as distinctive and indeed provides immediate identification of the species: it appears to bounce through the air with little sense of direction, almost as if drunk.

The larvae feed on Eriophorum, Poa annua, Calamagrostis canescens, Brachypodium and Molinia species (including Molinia coerulea).

Gallery

References

External links
Images representing Heteropterus  at Consortium for the Barcode of Life

Butterflies described in 1771
Heteropterinae
Butterflies of Europe
Taxa named by Peter Simon Pallas